Shan Star (Aye Tharyar Mai Tong Industry Co., Ltd) is a small light commercial vehicle manufacturer in Taunggyi, Shan State, Myanmar. Its products include light jeeps and pick-up trucks.

External link/Reference
Information in Autoindex 

Motor vehicle manufacturers of Myanmar